Liberty was a sloop owned by John Hancock, an American merchant, whose seizure was the subject of the Liberty Affair. Seized by customs officials in Boston in 1768, it was commissioned into the Royal Navy as HMS Liberty, and she was burned the next year by American colonists in Newport, Rhode Island in one of the first acts of open defiance against the British crown by American colonists.

History

The ship was originally owned by John Hancock. In 1768, British officials alleged that Bostonians locked a customs official in the Libertys cabin while the cargo of Madeira wine was unloaded in an effort to evade the Townshend Acts. In retaliation, the British government confiscated Liberty, and she was towed away by HMS Halifax. Charges against Hancock were eventually dropped, but Liberty remained confiscated.

The ship was refitted in Rhode Island to serve as a Royal Navy ship named HMS Liberty and then used to patrol off Rhode Island for customs violations. On 19 July 1769, the crew of Liberty under Captain William Reid accosted Joseph Packwood, a New London captain, and seized and towed two Connecticut ships into Newport. In retribution, Packwood and a mob of Rhode Islanders confronted Reid, then boarded, scuttled, and later burned the ship on the north end of Goat Island (although a small monument to the event, located in Equality Park on Broadway, states the sloop was dragged to the site of the park and burned there) in Newport harbor as one of the first overt American acts of defiance against the British government.

See also
 Gaspée Affair
 HMS St. John

References

Shipwrecks of the Rhode Island coast
Newport County, Rhode Island
Maritime incidents in 1769
Individual sailing vessels
Scuttled vessels